Evalea emeryi is a species of sea snail, a marine gastropod mollusk in the family Pyramidellidae, the pyrams and their allies.

Distribution
This marine species occurs in the following locations: from North Carolina to Texas. Fossils were found in Pliocene strata, north of St. Petersburg, Florida, USA.

References

External links
 To Encyclopedia of Life
 To World Register of Marine Species

Pyramidellidae
Gastropods described in 1955